Nong Kuai railway station is a railway station located in Don Ya Nang Subdistrict, Phachi District, Phra Nakhon Si Ayutthaya Province.

Train services 
As of 5 January 2022, 4 trains serve Nong Kuai railway station.

Outbound

Inbound

References 

Railway stations in Thailand